"In the Air" is a song by producer and DJ group True Tiger, featuring British singer Maverick Sabre and British rapper Professor Green. The track was released on 12 June 2011 as a digital download in the United Kingdom. A music video to accompany the release of "In the Air" was first released onto YouTube on 19 May 2011; at a total length of three minutes and twenty-five seconds.

Track listing

Chart performance

Release history

References

2011 singles
Maverick Sabre songs
Professor Green songs
True Tiger songs
2011 songs
Songs written by Professor Green
Virgin Records singles